Moores Fork is a  long 3rd order tributary to Stewarts Creek in Surry County, North Carolina.

Variant names
According to the Geographic Names Information System, it has also been known historically as:
McAfee Creek

Course 
Moores Fork rises in a pond at Crooked Oak, North Carolina and then flows south and east to join Stewarts Creek about 3 miles west-northwest of Toast, North Carolina.

Watershed 
Moores Fork drains  of area, receives about 47.8 in/year of precipitation, has a wetness index of 344.94, and is about 42% forested.

See also 
 List of Rivers of North Carolina

References 

Rivers of Surry County, North Carolina
Rivers of North Carolina